= Alnetoidea =

Scientific classification
- Domain: Eukaryota
- Kingdom: Animalia
- Phylum: Arthropoda
- Class: Insecta
- Order: Hemiptera
- Suborder: Auchenorrhyncha
- Family: Cicadellidae
- Genus: Alnetoidea; Dlabola, 1958

Genus of insects

Alnetoidea is a genus of true bugs belonging to the family Cicadellidae.

Species:

- Alnetoidea alneti
